John Little (April 25, 1837 – October 18, 1900) was a one-term U.S. Representative from Ohio from 1885 to 1887.

Biography 
Born near Grape Grove, Ross Township, Greene County, Ohio, Little attended the common schools.
He was graduated from Antioch College, Yellow Springs, Ohio, in 1862.
He studied law.
He was admitted to the bar in 1865 and commenced practice in Xenia, Ohio.
He served as mayor of Xenia 1864-1866.
He served as prosecuting attorney of Greene County 1866-1870.
He served as member of the state house of representatives 1869-1873.
Attorney general of Ohio 1873-1877.

Congress 
Little was elected as a Republican to the Forty-ninth Congress (March 4, 1885 – March 3, 1887).
In 1886, he was re-districted, and lost re-election by 2 votes.

Later career 
He resumed the practice of law.
He was appointed by President Harrison a member of the United States and Venezuela Claims Commission in 1889 and was its chairman.
He served as member of the Ohio State Board of Arbitration.
Trustee of Antioch College 1880-1900.
He died in Xenia, Ohio, on October 18, 1900.
He was interred in Woodland Cemetery.

Little married Barbara Jane Sheets, of Troy, Ohio, October 19, 1865. They had children named George and Mary. Barbara died at Xenia, May 30, 1902.

Sources

1837 births
1900 deaths
Ohio Attorneys General
Mayors of places in Ohio
Republican Party members of the Ohio House of Representatives
Antioch College alumni
Politicians from Xenia, Ohio
People from Yellow Springs, Ohio
County district attorneys in Ohio
Republican Party members of the United States House of Representatives from Ohio
19th-century American politicians